The 1961 Texas Tech Red Raiders football team represented Texas Technological College—now known as Texas Tech University—as a member of the Southwest Conference (SWC) during the 1961 NCAA University Division football season. In their first season under head coach J. T. King, the Red Raiders compiled a 4–6 record (2–5 against conference opponents), tied for sixth place in the SWC, and were outscored by opponents by a combined total of 201 to 94. The team's statistical leaders included Doug Cannon with 442 passing yards, Coolidge Hunt with 486 rushing yards, and Bob Witucki with 335 receiving yards. The team played its home games at Clifford B. and Audrey Jones Stadium.

Schedule

References

Texas Tech
Texas Tech Red Raiders football seasons
Texas Tech Red Raiders football